Girua Airport  is an airport serving Popondetta, a city in the Oro (or Northern) province in Papua New Guinea.

History
Girua Airport is located near Dobodura, to the north-east of the Embi Lakes, north-east of Inonda. To the south is Mt. Lamington, a volcano that dominates the skyline.  The airport was built during World War II as part of the Dobodura Airfield Complex during late 1942 and early 1943.   During the war, the airfield  had several names, including No. 7, West 7, or Horanda No. 7 Airstrip or West 7.   It was also known as Kenney Strip, in honor of Fifth Air Force Commander General George Kenney.

The main Dobodura complex had eleven airstrips, most interconnected for taxiing purposes.  At the height of the Battle of Buna-Gona supplies began landing at the airfields including artillery spotting planes, a 105mm and five Bren Gun Carriers used to assault Cape Endaiadere,

After the battle, Dobodura was developed into a major airbase, with storage and repair facilities, and interconnecting taxiways to adjacent airfields.  Today, Girua is the only airfield still in use, the others being abandoned after the war.

Major USAAF units assigned
 3d Bombardment Group                              (May 20, 1943 – February 3, 1944)
 Headquarters, 13th, 89th, 90th Bomb Squadrons, B-25 Mitchell
 22d Bombardment Group              (October 9, 1943 – January 13, 1944)
 Headquarters, 2d, 19th, 408th Bomb Squadrons, B-26 Marauder
 43d Bombardment Group                    (December 10, 1943 – March 4, 1944)
 Headquarters, 63d, 64th, 65th, 403d Bomb Squadrons, B-24 Liberator
 90th Bombardment Group                  (December 1943 – February 23, 1944)
 Headquarters, 319th, 320th, 321st, 400th Bomb Squadrons, B-24 Liberator
 345th Bombardment Group            (January 18 – February 16, 1944)
 Headquarters, 498th, 499th, 500th, 501st Bomb Squadrons, B-25 Mitchell
 417th Bombardment Group           (February 7 – April 8, 1944), (Headquarters)
 672d, 673d, 673d,  675th Bomb Squadrons, A-20 Havoc
 49th Fighter Group                      (March – November 20, 1943)
 Headquarters, 7th, 8th Fighter Squadrons, Curtiss P-40, 9th Fighter Squadron, P-38 Lightning and P-47 Thunderbolt
 58th Fighter Group           (December 28, 1943 – April 3, 1944)
 Headquarters, 69th, 310th, 311th Fighter Squadrons, P-47 Thunderbolt
 475th Fighter Group                   (August 14, 1943 – March 24, 1944) (Headquarters)
 432d Fighter Squadron, P-38 Lightning, (May 15 – July 12, 1944), (North Borio Airfield, Dobodura No. 15)
 433rd Fighter Squadron, P-38 Lightning, (August 14 – October 3, 1943), (Borio Airfield, Dobodura No. 11)
 418th Night Fighter Squadron (V Fighter Command)              (November 22, 1943 – March 28, 1944), P-61 Black Widow
 80th Fighter Squadron, (8th Fighter Group), (December 11, 1943 – February 28, 1944), P-38 Lightning
 375th Troop Carrier Group, (August 19 – December 19, 1943) (HQ Echelon)

Airlines and destinations

See also

 USAAF in the Southwest Pacific

References

External links
 www.pacificwrecks.com
 

Airports in Papua New Guinea
Airfields of the United States Army Air Forces in Papua New Guinea
Oro Province
Airports established in 1943